Khajani is a small village in Simraungadh municipality, Bara District, Nepal. It lies in Madesh.

Populated places in Bara District